The American Film Market (AFM) is a film industry event held each year in early November.

Historically, more than 7,000 people attend the eight-day annual event to network and to sell, finance and acquire films. Participants come from more than 70 countries and include acquisition and development executives, agents, attorneys, directors, distributors, festival directors, financiers, film commissioners, producers, writers, etc. Founded in 1981, the AFM is a marketplace for the film business, where unlike a film festival, production and distribution deals are the main focus of the participants. It was founded by the American Film Marketing Association, headed by film producer Andy Vajna.

The AFM is held at the Loews Santa Monica Beach Hotel (since 1991). The 2020 and 2021 editions were both online-only in the first week of November due to the COVID-19 pandemic. 

The American Film Market utilizes 29 movie theater screens on Santa Monica's Third Street Promenade and in the surrounding community to accommodate 700 screenings of over 400 films (often world or U.S. premieres). The films shown are ones seeking theatrical and television distribution.

The AFM is produced by the Independent Film & Television Alliance (IFTA), the trade association representing the world's producers and distributors of independent motion pictures and television programs.

References

External links
 

Trade shows in the United States
Film distribution
Film markets
Film organizations in the United States
Organizations established in 1981
1981 establishments in the United States